Didi Barrett is a Democratic member of the New York State Assembly representing Assembly District 106, which includes parts of Dutchess and Columbia Counties.

Barrett was elected to the Assembly on March 20, 2012, after a special election to succeed Marcus Molinaro. She serves on the board of the North East Dutchess Fund of the Berkshire Taconic Community Foundation, and is a trustee of the Anderson Foundation for Autism. She is also a founding chairwoman of Girls Incorporated of NYC, and a former board member of NARAL Pro-Choice New York. She is a trustee emeritus of the American Folk Art Museum.

In November 2012, Barrett won re-election in the newly created 106th district seat with 54.3% of the vote. She was re-elected with 50.8% of the vote in November 2014, 55.85% of the vote in November 2016, and 55.4% of the vote in November 2018, and she once again won reelection in 2020.

References

External links
New York State Assembly Member Website
Campaign Website

1950 births
Living people
People from Columbia County, New York
Democratic Party members of the New York State Assembly
Women state legislators in New York (state)
21st-century American politicians
21st-century American women politicians